Tony Luke Kocherry (born 10 November 1985) is an Indian actor who predominantly appears in Malayalam films. He began his career as a fashion model and later forayed into cinema, debuting with Oozham (2016) in a supporting role. In 2019, Tony made his Bollywood debut with a supporting role in the crime thriller Badla (2019), starring Amitabh Bachchan and Taapsee Pannu.

Early life
Tony was born to Thresia Kocherry and Luke Kocherry on 10 November 1985, at Kochi, Kerala in India. He is an IT engineering graduate from the PES University in Bangalore and a post-graduate in International Business Administration (IBA) from Regent's Business School London. Tony attended The Choice School, Ernakulam where he was active in sports.

Career

Modelling
The actor started modelling at the age of 19 in Bangalore while in college. In 2005, he debuted as an international model represented by Major Model Management in Milan, Italy. 

In 2014, Tony played a minor role in an experimental short film named Karma Cartel, which went on to win awards and honors in various film festivals across the globe.

Film acting
He made his film debut in 2016 with the Malayalam film Oozham directed by Jeethu Joseph and starring Prithviraj Sukumaran in the lead. Tony's performance met with critical acclaim for his portrayal of the 25 year old character Andrew Wilfred-Marcus. After the success of Oozham, Tony played the role of the antagonist in the political thriller Sakhavu (2017) directed by Sidhartha Siva, starring Nivin Pauly in lead. Tony received positive reviews for his portrayal of the sadistic, cruel 40-year-old character of a manager who enslaves workers on the tea estates of pre-independent India.

In 2018, Luke starred in Naam, a campus story, where he played a 22-year-old. In the same year, he went on to appear as a 30-year-old computer hacker in commercial blockbuster Aadhi, directed by Jeethu Joseph, starring Pranav Mohanlal in the lead. In 2019, The actor was seen in Science Fiction Psychological thriller 9 starring Prithviraj Sukumaran and directed by Jenuse Mohammad.

On March 8, 2019, Luke made his Hindi Bollywood debut in a prominent supporting role in the crime thriller Badla directed by Sujoy Ghosh starring Amitabh Bachchan and Taapsee Pannu. The film went onto gross 100 crores in the Indian domestic Box office.

Filmography

Films

Web series

References

External links
 

Living people
1985 births
Male actors from Kerala
Male actors in Malayalam cinema
Indian male models